Chrysochraontini is a tribe of grasshoppers belonging to the subfamily Gomphocerinae.

Genera
The Orthoptera Species File lists:
Barracris - monotypic: B.  petraea Gurney, Strohecker & Helfer, 1963 
Chloealtis Harris, T.W., 1841 
Chrysochraon Fischer, 1854 - type genus
Confusacris Yin, X. & B. Li, 1987 
Euchorthippus Tarbinsky, 1926
Euthystira Fieber, 1853 
Euthystiroides Zhang, F., Yiping Zheng & Bingzhong Ren, 1995 
Mongolotettix Rehn, 1928 (synonym Heteropterus Wang, 1992)
Podismomorpha - monotypic: P. gibba Lian & Zheng, 1984
Podismopsis Zubovski, 1900
Pseudoasonus Yin, X., 1982

References

Gomphocerinae
Orthoptera tribes
Taxa named by Carl Brunner von Wattenwyl